The Tower of Mortella is a ruined Genoese tower on  Corsica, located on the coast near Punta Mortella (Myrtle Point) in the commune of Saint-Florent, Haute-Corse.  It was a progenitor of the numerous Martello towers the British built in the 19th century throughout their empire.

History

The Italian architect Giovan Giacomo Paleari Fratino designed the Tour de Mortella and Colonel Giorgio Doria directed the construction between 1563 and 1564. It was one of a series of coastal defences constructed by the Republic of Genoa between 1530 and 1620 to repulse attacks by Barbary pirates.

Late in the previous year, the tower's French defenders had abandoned the tower after  (32 guns) had fired two broadsides at it. The French easily dislodged the garrison of Corsican patriots that had replaced them.  Still, the British were impressed by the effectiveness of the tower when it was properly supplied and defended so they copied the design. However, they misspelled the name as "Martello" for "Mortella". When the British withdrew from Corsica in 1796, they blew up the tower and left it in an unusable state.

Current status
The ruined tower was listed as one of the official Historical Monuments of France in 1991. The database incorrectly gives the date of construction as 1553–1554. This earlier date is when Spanish and Genoese troops led by Admiral Andrea Doria besieged the French forces occupying the port of Saint-Florent after the Franco-Turkish invasion of the island.

Since 1980 the French government agency the Conservatoire du littoral has owned and maintained the site. The Conservatoire plans to purchase  of the surrounding coastline and  had acquired .

See also
 
Martello Tower
List of Genoese towers in Corsica
Agriates Desert

Citations

References

External links
 Information on how to reach 90 towers. Includes 1,261 photographs.

Towers in Corsica
Monuments historiques of Corsica